Jason Stuart is an American actor and comedian.

Jason Stuart may also refer to:

Jason Stuart (musician)

See also
Jason Stewart (disambiguation)